Spirovsky (masculine), Spirovskaya (feminine), or Spirovskoye (neuter) may refer to:

Spirovsky District, a district of Tver Oblast, Russia
Spirovskaya, a rural locality (a village) in Vologda Oblast, Russia

See also
Spirovo